Edward Allan (Al) Horning (born 11 June 1939 in Regina, Saskatchewan) is a Canadian politician. His career included real estate, shipping, business and orchards.

Horning attended secondary school at Rutland, British Columbia then studied at the University of British Columbia. In 1980, he became an alderman for the Kelowna City Council, where he remained until 1988.

He was elected to the House of Commons of Canada in the 1988 federal election at the Okanagan Centre electoral district for the Progressive Conservative party. He served in the 34th Canadian Parliament but lost to Werner Schmidt of the Reform Party in the 1993 federal election. He made another unsuccessful bid to return to federal Parliament in the 1997 federal election at the Kelowna riding. In 2002, he returned to Kelowna City Council as a councillor.

In the 2005 provincial election in British Columbia, Horning was elected to the Legislative Assembly of British Columbia, representing Kelowna-Lake Country as a member of the BC Liberals. He did not run for re-election in the 2009 election.

References

External links

1939 births
British Columbia Liberal Party MLAs
Kelowna city councillors
Living people
Members of the House of Commons of Canada from British Columbia
Politicians from Regina, Saskatchewan
Progressive Conservative Party of Canada MPs
University of British Columbia alumni
21st-century Canadian politicians